Winfield Scott Cunningham (February 16, 1900 – March 3, 1986) was the Officer in Charge, Naval Activities, Wake Island when the tiny island was attacked by the Japanese on December 8, 1941. Cunningham commanded the defense of the island against the massive Japanese attack. After 15 days, he surrendered the island to the Japanese. Cunningham was taken prisoner and held as a POW in Japan. He was awarded the Navy Cross for his leadership at Wake Island.

Early life
Winfield Cunningham was born on February 16, 1900, in Rockbridge, Wisconsin. He was the son of Frederick Michael and Ruth Ella (Moore) Cunningham. Cunningham attended high school at Camp Douglas.

Military career
In 1916, at the age of 16 and after completing his junior year in high school, he was appointed to the United States Naval Academy at Annapolis in Maryland, along the Chesapeake Bay. Because of World War I, his Class of 1920 was graduated a year early – on June 6, 1919. Cunningham was commissioned an ensign in the United States Navy and his first assignment was on the naval transport , which brought troops home from France. He would then spend the next two years on ships off the coast of Turkey in the Aegean and Mediterranean Seas. Returning to the U.S., on May 3, 1923, he was promoted to lieutenant (jg), with his promotion backdated to June 7, 1922.

While serving in China, Cunningham applied to enter aviation training. Though turned down in this first request, he put in requests several times and was finally accepted in 1924. On February 14, 1925, he reported as a student naval aviator to the Naval Air Station Pensacola, Florida. While in training he was promoted to lieutenant on June 7, 1925, and was designated a naval aviator on September 11, 1925, becoming an aviator qualified in both fighters and flying boats.

On November 2, 1936, Lieutenant Commander Cunningham reported for duty involving flying as Commanding Officer of Fighting FIVE (VF-5). The squadron would become part of the USS Yorktown (CV-5) Air Group flying the Grumman F2F-1. Cunningham served in this capacity until the Summer of 1938.

Wake Island

On November 28, 1941, Cunningham, by now a commander, reported for duty as officer in charge, all naval activities, Wake Island. His command briefing gave top priority to completing the naval air station, over any attention to improving the island's defenses.

On December 8, 1941, news of the attack on Pearl Harbor naval / air bases in Hawaii reached Wake Island at 07:00 am, less than  hours after the Japanese struck further east. Cunningham ordered all personnel to battle stations; at the same time Major James Devereux, USMC commanding officer of the Wake Detachment of the 1st Marine Defense Battalion, ordered a "Call to Arms".  Cunningham recalled the Philippine Clipper (a Martin 130 flying boat) of Pan American Airways and set in motion plans for a scouting patrol. It was to take off at 13:00 hours (1:00 pm). However, a bombing attack by the Imperial Japanese Navy began at 1157. The bombing continued for days. On December 11, Japanese warships approached the Island.

Cunningham ordered the Marine commander, Major James Devereux, to hold their fire until the ships were in easy range. The small U.S. force on the island repulsed the initial landing attempt, but they were in serious need of additional supplies and support – including gunsights, spare parts and fire-control radar – which Cunningham had requested earlier from the commandant, 14th Naval District. But no reinforcements were to come by the attack.

Wake remained under attack by the Japanese. After 15 days, with Japanese marines finally swarming over the island, on December 23, 1941,  Cunningham finally gave the order for surrender. Cunningham, along with surviving personnel and contractors, were taken captive.

Prisoner of war
 
Cunningham and his fellow prisoners were taken aboard the Japanese transport Nitta Maru to Shanghai, China by way of Yokohama, Japan. Treatment was harsh – five POWs were executed on board, and the imprisoned contractors left on Wake were later executed. Twice during his captivity, Cunningham attempted to escape and was later recaptured by the Japanese. During his captivity, he lost over 70 pounds. On August 18, 1945, after 1330 days of confinement, the Japanese prison commander announced the end of the war.

On August 24, 1945, Cunningham left China aboard a U.S. Army aircraft. He finally arrived in the U.S., returning on September 4, 1945, the same day Wake Island was formally surrendered by the Japanese to an arriving U.S. Marine detachment.

Return to the U.S.
On September 10, 1945, Cunningham underwent a complete physical examination at the National Naval Medical Center in Bethesda, Maryland. He was found fit to return to duty. On December 4, 1945, he received notice of his promotion to captain, effective June 20, 1942. In January 1946, he began a period of retraining, beginning with refresher aviation training at the Naval Air Station in Pensacola, Florida.

In May 1946, Captain Cunningham returned to sea duty as the commanding officer of the seaplane tender  (AV-4).  During his time as commander, Curtiss operated with patrol squadrons in the Formosa Strait, ferried men and supplies to outlying bases and made several visits to Tsingtao, China, before returning the United States in March 1947.

Cunningham's final duty was as commanding officer, Naval Technical Training Center, Memphis, Tennessee, from June 23, 1947, until his retirement on June 30, 1950, at the rank of rear admiral.

Retirement
After retirement, Cunningham lived in Memphis, Tennessee. He wrote a book, Wake Island Command (1961), about the historic battle. He died on March 3, 1986, at age 86 and was buried in the Memphis National Cemetery.

Awards

Navy Cross citation
The President of the United States of America takes pleasure in presenting the Navy Cross to Commander Winfield Scott Cunningham (NSN: 0-56074), United States Navy, for extraordinary heroism and distinguished service in the line of his profession as Commanding Officer of Commanding Officer, Naval Air Station, Wake Island, where he was responsible for directing defenses of that post during the Japanese siege from 7 through 22 December 1941, against impossible odds. Commander Cunningham's inspiring leadership and the valiant devotion to duty of his command contributed in large measure to the outstanding success of these vital missions and reflect great credit upon the United States Naval Service.
General Orders: Bureau of Naval Personnel Information Bulletin No. 317 (August 1943)

Action Date: December 7–22, 1941

Bibliography
 Cunningham, Winfield S. (with Lydel Sims), Wake Island Command, Boston: Little, Brown and Co., 1961. (ASIN B0006AX13C)
 Sloan, Bill. Given Up for Dead: America's Heroic Stand at Wake Island. New York: Random House, 2004. Print.

See also
James Devereux
Paul A. Putnam
Detailed biography of Admiral Cunningham

References
Cunningham, Gregory Robert. Winfield Scott Cunningham, in Navy History, February 27, 2003.  Retrieved on 2006-06-30.
Cressman, Robert J. "Commander Winfield S. Cunningham", in A Magnificent Fight: Marines in the Battle for Wake Island, Marines in World War II Commemorative Series, History and Museum Division, United States Marine Corps. Retrieved on 2006-07-09.
Keene, R.R. "Wake Island: The Corps Raised Its Name to Honor and Fame" , American Legion Magazine, 1942 – reprinted in Leatherneck.

1900 births
1986 deaths
United States Navy personnel of World War II
United States Naval Aviators
Recipients of the Navy Cross (United States)
People from Richland County, Wisconsin
World War II prisoners of war held by Japan
United States Naval Academy alumni
United States Navy rear admirals (lower half)
Battle of Wake Island
American prisoners of war in World War II
Military personnel from Wisconsin